An American Rhapsody is a 2001 biographical drama film written and directed by Éva Gárdos. Based on Gárdos' life story, the film tells the story of a 15-year-old girl from a Hungarian-American family.

The film stars Nastassja Kinski, Scarlett Johansson, Tony Goldwyn, and Mae Whitman.

Plot
In 1950, a Hungarian couple, Peter and Margit, are forced to flee from the oppressive Hungarian People's Republic for the United States, taking along their eldest daughter Maria. Unfortunately, they are forced to leave behind their infant daughter, Suzanne, who is raised by a kind foster couple. Five years later, Peter and Margit arrange for the American Red Cross to bring Suzanne to their new home in Los Angeles. There, the perplexed young girl is forced to accept her sudden change in home and country, which leads to a troubled upbringing. At age 15, Suzanne, rebellious and unsure of herself, tries to come to terms with her roots and decides to travel back to Budapest, Hungary, to unravel her past and to find her true identity.

Cast
 Nastassja Kinski as Margit Sandor
 Scarlett Johansson as Suzanne Sandor (age 15)
 Kelly Endrész Banlaki as Suzanne (age 5–6)
 Raffaella Bánsági as Suzanne (infant)
 Tony Goldwyn as Peter Sandor
 Mae Whitman as Maria Sandor (age 10)
 Larisa Oleynik as Maria Sandor (age 18)
 Ági Bánfalvy as Helen
 Zoltán Seress as George
 Zsuzsa Czinkóczi as Teri
 Balázs Galkó as Jeno
 Lisa Jane Persky as Patti
 Colleen Camp as Dottie
 Emmy Rossum as Sheila (age 15)
 Éva Soreny as Eva
 Kata Dobó as Claire
 Jacqueline Steiger as Betty

Reception
An American Rhapsody received mixed reviews, currently holding a 51/100 rating on Metacritic based on 22 critics, indicating "mixed or average reviews". Rotten Tomatoes gives the film a 55% approval rating based on 60 reviews, with an average rating of 5.61/10. The website's critics consensus reads, "Though obviously a labor of love, American Rhapsody is an uneven, heavy-handed effort, particularly in the second half".

References

External links
 
 
 
 
 

2001 films
2001 biographical drama films
2001 independent films
2001 multilingual films
2000s American films
2000s coming-of-age drama films
2000s English-language films
2000s Hungarian-language films
American biographical drama films
American coming-of-age drama films
American independent films
American multilingual films
Autobiographical films
English-language Hungarian films
Films about film directors and producers
Films about immigration to the United States
Films scored by Cliff Eidelman
Films set in 1950
Films set in 1955
Films set in 1956
Films set in 1958
Films set in 1965
Films set in Hungary
Films set in Los Angeles
Films shot in Budapest
Films shot in Los Angeles
Fireworks Entertainment films
Hungarian-American history
Hungarian biographical drama films
Hungarian multilingual films
Paramount Pictures films